The 1861 Connecticut gubernatorial election was held on April 1, 1861. Incumbent governor and Republican nominee William Alfred Buckingham defeated Democratic nominee James Chaffee Loomis with 51.23% of the vote.

General election

Candidates
Major party candidates

William Alfred Buckingham, Republican
James Chaffee Loomis, Democratic

Results

References

1861
Connecticut
Gubernatorial